Cladun: This is an RPG, known in Japan as , is a 2010 action role-playing video game developed by System Prisma and published by Nippon Ichi Software (its parent company) for the PlayStation Portable. The game was released in Japan on February 18, 2010, in North America on September 20, 2010 and in Europe on November 17, 2010.

Cladun: This is an RPG features cooperative and competitive gameplay with up to three other players. Dungeons are randomly generated and the game features customization of not only the main character but also the final boss. Developer Souhei Niikawa compares the game's retro art style to What Did I Do to Deserve This, My Lord?, another Nippon Ichi title. Two sequels for this game were released, ClaDun x2, which was released in 2011 for the PlayStation Portable, and was made available for PC via Steam on August 14, 2012, and ClaDun Returns: This Is Sengoku!, which was released for the PlayStation Vita, PlayStation 4 and Steam in 2016-2017.

Gameplay

Custom Characters 

Custom characters are characters that players create. Players choose a job class, a default format of the character, name, the color and form of the characters boss, and conversation type. After this, the face of the character, the conversation, and other aspects can be edited.

Plot 

The story starts with a girl named Pudding and a boy named Soma going to a gate that Pudding believes is a way to go to the magical world "Arcanus Cella". Upon entering, they find themselves in Arcanus Cella. The story progresses as the player finishes levels to unlock characters and places. Each time a floor of a dungeon is finished, more floors are unlocked and sometimes a scene may unlock new characters, or show something about the characters in the game.

Reception

Cladun: This is an RPG 

Claddun: This is an RPG received "generally favorable reviews" according to the review aggregation website Metacritic. In Japan, Famitsu gave it a score of 28 out of 40.

ClaDun x2 

ClaDun x2 received above-average reviews on both platforms according to Metacritic. In Japan, Famitsu gave the PSP version a score of 28 out of 40.

ClaDun Returns: This Is Sengoku! 

ClaDun Returns: This Is Sengoku! received "mixed or average reviews" on all platforms according to Metacritic. In Japan, Famitsu gave the PlayStation Vita version a score of 31 out of 40.

References

External links 
  
 
 
 

2010 video games
2011 video games
2016 video games
Action role-playing video games
Fantasy video games
Nippon Ichi Software games
PlayStation 4 games
PlayStation Portable games
PlayStation Vita games
Role-playing video games
Video games developed in Japan
Video games using procedural generation
Windows games